The 1873 Devonshire South by-election was fought on 17 June 1873.  The byelection was fought due to the death of the incumbent MP of the Conservative Party, Samuel Trehawke Kekewich.  It was won by the Conservative candidate John Carpenter Garnier, who was unopposed.

References

1873 in England
1873 elections in the United Kingdom
By-elections to the Parliament of the United Kingdom in Devon constituencies
19th century in Devon
Unopposed by-elections to the Parliament of the United Kingdom in English constituencies